Ethiopia competed in the Olympic Games for the first time at the 1956 Summer Olympics in Melbourne, Australia. Twelve competitors, all men, took part in ten events in two sports.

Athletics

Men's 100m 
 Abebe Hailou —
 Heat — 11.54 (→ did not advance)  
 Beyene Legesse —
 Heat — 11.94 (→ did not advance)  
 Roba Negousse —
 Heat — 12.07 (→ did not advance)  
Men's 200m 
 Abebe Hailou —
 Heat — 23.25 (→ did not advance)  
 Beyene Legesse —
 Heat —  23.63 (→ did not advance)  
 Roba Negousse —
 Heat — 23.89 (→ did not advance)  
Men's 400m 
 Ajanew Bayene —
 Heat — 51.53 (→ did not advance)  
 Abebe Hailou —
 Heat — 49.18 (→ did not advance)  
 Beyene Legesse —
 Heat — 50.83 (→ did not advance)  
Men's 800m 
 Ajanew Bayene —
 Heat — DNF (→ did not advance)  
 Mamo Wolde 
 Heat — 1:58.0 (→ did not advance)  
Men's 1500m
 Mamo Wolde —
 Heat — 3:51.0 (→ did not advance) 
Men's 4 x 100 Relay
 Bekele Haile
 Abebe Hailou
 Beyene Legesse
 Roba Negousse
 Heat — 44.47 (→ did not advance) 
Men's 4 x 400 Relay 
 Ajanew Bayene  
 Abebe Hailou  
 Beyene Legesse  
 Mamo Wolde
 Heat — 3:29.93 (→ did not advance)  
Men's Marathon 
Bashay Feleke — 2:53:37 (→ 29th place)
Gebre Birkay — 2:58:49 (→ 32nd place)

Cycling

Team road race
Guremu DembobaMesfen TesfayeZehaye Bahta — 99 points (→ 9th place)

Individual road race
Guremu Demboba — 5:26:58 (→ 25th place)
Mesfen Tesfaye — 5:34:25 (→ 36th place)
Zehaye Bahta — 5:34:37 (→ 38th place)
Negousse Mengistu — did not finish (→ no ranking)

References

External links
Official Olympic Reports

1956 in Ethiopian sport
Nations at the 1956 Summer Olympics
1956